The Men's +105 kg weightlifting event at the 2007 Pan American Games took place at the Complexo Esportivo Riocentro on 18 July 2007.

Schedule
All times are Brasilia Time (UTC-3)

Records
Prior to this competition, the existing world, Pan American and Games records were as follows:

The following records were established during the competition:

Results

References

Weightlifting at the 2007 Pan American Games